Lars Johan Paulsson (born 28 December 1970) is a Swedish former football striker.

References

1970 births
Living people
Swedish footballers
Kalmar FF players
Örebro SK players
Bryne FK players
Association football forwards
Swedish expatriate footballers
Expatriate footballers in Norway
Swedish expatriate sportspeople in Norway
Allsvenskan players
Eliteserien players